Birsanagar is a part of Jamshedpur. It covers a major part of Jamshedpur that are planned and divided into 12 zones which are further divided into smaller zones. Birsanagar was formed after hard struggle and labor by the original inhabitants "Adiwasi's" a few of the fighters were Birsa Munda, Sidhu and Kanu. Birsanagar was named after Birsa Munda. Birsanagar is thought to be a poor place but now has become a get away because of its greenery and natural appeal. To have a house in Birsanagar is a good option for those who like living in open places. Birsanagar has a self-sufficient market so that the residents of it do not have to go elsewhere for the basic amenities. There is a huge vegetable market every Sunday and Thursday. This market is most famous for the fresh vegetables one can buy here from the far and nearby villagers selling themselves from their own small farms. The so-called Tusu Mela is organized here on the occasion of Makar Sankranti and the sky is flooded with colorful kites. Birsanagar shares the same boundary with Tata Motors colony. Birsanagar is one of the oldest place in the history of Jharkhand and it still comprises many tribal such as Oraon, Munda, Ho, Sarna, etc. Major land area of Birsanagar belongs to the tribal who have been living here for a very long time and although they have now modernized, they play a key role in saving their land and environment.

Civic administration
There is a police station at Birsanagar.

See also
 Jamshedpur
 List of neighbourhoods of Jamshedpur
 Sakchi
 Adityapur
 Jugsalai
 Garabasa
 Bagbera

References

Jamshedpur
Neighbourhoods in Jamshedpur